The 2009 Slovak Cup Final was the final match of the 2009–10 Slovak Cup, the 40th season of the top cup competition in Slovak football. The match was played at the NTC Senec in Senec on 20 May 2009 between MFK Košice and FC Artmedia Petržalka. MFK Košice defeated Artmedia 3-1.

Route to the final

Match

Details

References

Slovak Cup Finals
Slovak Cup
Slovak Cup
Cup Final